The THOR III is man-portable, counter-radio-controlled improvised explosive device (IED) jammer built by Sierra Nevada Corp and employed by the U.S. Army, U.S. Marine Corps, and partnered Afghan National Army soldiers in Afghanistan. Sierra Nevada received the initial contract in December 2007.  This system uses three transceivers mounted on backpacks to jam radio-controlled IEDs; each of the three different transceivers jams a different frequency bandwidth (Low, Mid, and High).

See also 

 Joint Improvised Explosive Device Defeat Organization (JIEDDO)

References 

Military equipment of the United States